Laura Crafton Gilpin (1950–2007) was an American poet, nurse, and advocate for hospital reform.

Gilpin was born on October 10, 1950, to Robert Crafton Gilpin and Bertha Burghard. Gilpin attended Sarah Lawrence College and Columbia University.

In 1976, Gilpin was awarded the Walt Whitman Award by the Academy of American Poets for her book of poems titled The Hocus-Pocus of the Universe. She was selected by William Stafford. Gilpin later wrote another book of poetry, titled The Weight of a Soul. Her work was also published in the magazine Poetry. In 1981, Gilpin became a registered nurse. She was a founding member of Planetree, which has been described as a "pioneering organization dedicated to humanizing patient care in hospitals". Gilpin worked to develop and implement hospital care centered around patients.

Gilpin died on February 15, 2007, in Fairhope, Alabama, at age 56.

Bibliography 
 The Hocus-Pocus of the Universe (Doubleday, 1977)
 The Weight of a Soul (Franklin Street Press, 2008)

References

External links 
 Laura Gilpin at Find a Grave

1950 births
2007 deaths
20th-century American poets
American nurses
American women poets
American women nurses
20th-century American women writers
Sarah Lawrence College alumni
Columbia University alumni
21st-century American poets
21st-century American women writers